The 2013–14 Delaware State Hornets men's basketball team represented Delaware State University during the 2013–14 NCAA Division I men's basketball season. The Hornets, led by 14th year head coach Greg Jackson, played their home games at Memorial Hall and were members of the Mid-Eastern Athletic Conference. They finished the season 9–21, 5–11 in MEAC play to finish in a five way tie for eighth place. They lost in the first round of the MEAC tournament to Florida A&M.

On January 30, after starting the season 4–15, head coach Greg Jackson was fired. In 14 years he led the Hornets to 200 wins, one shy of the school record. The Hornets were led by interim head coach Keith Walker for the remainder of the season.

Roster

Schedule

|-
! colspan="9" style="background:#f00; color:#9bddff;"| Regular season

|-
! colspan="9" style="background:#f00; color:#9bddff;"| MEAC tournament

References

Delaware State Hornets men's basketball seasons
Delaware State
Delaware State Hornets men's basketball
Delaware State Hornets men's basketball